Music for Speeding is the fifth studio album by guitarist Marty Friedman, released on May 20, 2003 through Favored Nations Entertainment. It was his first solo album since True Obsessions in 1996 and since leaving Megadeth in January 2000.

Track listing

Musicians
Marty Friedman - guitars, programming and sequencing, shamisen
Jimmy O'Shea - bass
Barry Sparks - bass
Jeremy Colson - drums
Brian Becvar - keyboards
James "Jake" Jacobson - synthistration and arranging on track 7
Jason Moss - additional programming
Ben Woods - flamenco guitar on track 7

External links
 Detailed song information from Marty's official website.

2003 albums
Instrumental albums
Marty Friedman albums